The Telegraph Column, located in Damascus, Syria, is a commemorative monument celebrating the completion of the telegraph line between that city and Hajj sites, in the former Ottoman Empire. It was designed by Raimondo D'Aronco.

History
Monuments such as this and the Jezreel Valley Railway monument in Haifa were designed to commemorate the "charitable works" of Abdul Hamid II for his people; the railway would be used to carry pilgrims to the Hajj and the telegraph would allow rapid communication between the two locations.

Description
The monument consists of a cast-iron column on stone base  adorned with representations of telegraph lines and insulators running along the pole. The notable feature of the monument is the mosque on top of the column, "in the place on the upper part of the capital traditionally reserved for emperors, kings, saints, war heroes […], and explorers […] and other great men, a clear statement that a Western model was not always acceptable without fundamental change". The mosque at the top of the column is a scale replica of the Yıldız Hamidiye Mosque at the entrance of the Yıldız Palace in Istanbul.  Inscriptions on the base in Arabic and Ottoman Turkish explain how it is now the Sultan-caliph that makes decisions  on such matters as telegraphs, railroads and highways, instead of Europeans. 

The current monument is designed in an Art-Nouveau styling and breaks from an earlier design that would have used an obelisk on a pedestal with four fountains. Opened in the early 1900s, it "is an elegant, bulbous column festooned with faux telegraph wires". The use of architecture atop the column instead of a figurative statue serves as a unique indication of Ottoman power. 

The monument is a focal point of Marjeh Square in Damascus. It served as a symbol of the municipal administration until circa 2010

References

Monuments and memorials in Syria